Eisenhower Avenue is a rapid transit station on the Yellow Line of the Washington Metro in Alexandria, Virginia. It opened on December 17, 1983.

Location
The station is located at Eisenhower Avenue near Stovall Street, next to the Capital Beltway and the Hoffman Town Center entertainment complex. The station provides connections to Metro's REX (Richmond Highway Express) bus service and the DASH bus service run by the city of Alexandria.

Notable places nearby
 Albert V. Bryan US Courthouse
 American Trucking Association
 Capital Beltway
 National Science Foundation
 Strayer University (Alexandria Campus)
 United States Patent and Trademark Office

History
Originally scheduled to open in summer 1982, its opening was delayed due to both unavailability of new subway cars and the lack of a test track. Construction of the station was complete by summer 1982, and in September 1983 Metro announced the station would open that December as the new cars would be ready for service. The station opened on December 17, 1983.

In May 2018, Metro announced an extensive renovation of platforms at twenty stations across the system. The Blue and Yellow Lines south of Ronald Reagan Washington National Airport station, including the Eisenhower Avenue station, would be closed from May to September 2019, during which the platforms at this station would be rebuilt.

From March 26, 2020 until June 28, 2020, this station was closed due to the 2020 coronavirus pandemic.

Between September 10, 2022 and November 5, 2022, Eisenhower Avenue was closed due to the Potomac Yard station tie-in, closing all stations south of Ronald Reagan Washington National Airport station. Shuttle buses were provided throughout the shutdown. Additionally, beginning on November 6, 2022, Blue Line trains began serving Eisenhower Avenue due to the suspension of the Yellow Line from the 14th Street Bridge project. Trains operated between Huntington and  stations.

Station layout
Eisenhower Avenue station is one of only two elevated side-platformed stations in the Metro system, with the other being . Access to each platform is provided by a pair of escalators and an elevator. It is also one of only two stations that are serviced exclusively by the Yellow Line, the other being .

References

External links 
 

 The Schumin Web Transit Center: Eisenhower Avenue Station
 Station from Google Maps Street View

Washington Metro stations in Virginia
Transportation in Alexandria, Virginia
Stations on the Yellow Line (Washington Metro)
Railway stations in the United States opened in 1983
1983 establishments in Virginia